Poetic Terrorism is the fifth studio album by the Norwegian rock band BigBang, which was released in April 2005.

Overview
Øystein Greni describes the record as "minimalistic" and reminiscent of the Dinosaur Jr./Hüsker Dü era punk rock ("Wherever You Are") to "a more west coast 1976 acting things and symphonic orchestra". According to him, what distinguishes the record is its minimalistic indie production and its variety. Also for the first time, no instrumental numbers are available. There are no acoustic ballads such as "Make a Circle" / "Sing and Dance".

This is the first LP to be released by Øystein's Grand Sport Records indie label since the original 1995 Waxed. The four-year Warner Norway deal has ended up with Radio Radio TV Sleep since Greni opted to produce his own records.

"On Your Mind" is a new version of the track that was released in the Smiling For 2001 EP. An alternative take of Not a Rolling Stone was published six months later in a 2-track EP bearing the same name and featuring video footages (including the Saturn Freeway promo) for the very first time.

The album is produced by Øystein Greni and is mixed by American producer/engineer Sylvia Massy (Tom Petty, Prince, R.E.M. and Johnny Cash).

It was released in the UK in September 2006.

Track listing
 "Saturn Freeway" – 3:03
 "Fly Like a Butterfly..." – 3:28
 "Wherever You Are" – 4:13
 "Looking Good From a Distance" – 3:52
 "From Acid to Zen" – 4:00
 "Head Over Heels" – 3:27
 "Not a Rolling Stone" – 3:40
 "On Your Mind" – 3:24
 "The Gullwing Groove" – 3:22
 "Going Home" – 2:52 
 "Music in Me" – 3:41

Personnel
Øystein Greni - vocals, guitars, percussion
Erik Tresselt - Bass, vocals
Olaf Olsen - drums, vocals, percussion
Nikolai Eilertsen - Guitar, vocals
Maria Orieta - Piano (on Music In Me)

References

2005 albums
Bigbang (Norwegian band) albums